Adrian Street (born 5 December 1940) is a retired Welsh professional wrestler and author known for his flamboyant, androgynous wrestling persona, brought to prominence in the 1970s and 1980s. Street was often accompanied to the ring by his long-time manager and wife Miss Linda, and the two worked primarily as heels.

Early life
Born in Brynmawr in Brecknockshire, Street's family was in the coal mining business – his father was a miner for 51 years. In his teenage years, he began bodybuilding. He left home at age 16 and began his professional wrestling career in 1957. His early inspirations were American wrestlers Lou Thesz, Buddy Rogers and Don Leo Jonathan (from whom Street adopted his first moniker, Kid Tarzan Jonathan).

Professional wrestling career
Street was trained as a professional wrestler by Chic Osmond and Mike Demitre. His first professional wrestling match was on 8 August 1957. Using the name Kid Tarzan Jonathan, Street defeated Geoff Moran.

Later in his career, he developed his "Exotic" Adrian Street image, an outrageously-attired, effeminate character who was hinted but never outright-stated to be gay. Street has explained that this gimmick was born by accident as a result of him playing up to taunting from an audience one evening, commenting "I was getting far more reaction than I'd ever got just playing this poof. My costumes started getting wilder". His wrestling attire evolved to including pastels and glitter make up and clipping his bleached hair into mini-pigtails. As "The Exotic One" his signature move in the ring was to kiss opponents to escape being pinned down and to put make up on his opponents when they were disabled.  He also sang several glam rock songs, such as "Sweet Transvestite with a Broken Nose" and "Imagine What I Could Do To You"; the latter being his entrance music.

Working primarily as a heel, Street travelled all over the world including wrestling in Germany, Canada and Mexico. In the UK, he formed a tag partnership with fellow heel Bobby Barnes named the Hells Angels. In 1969 Street met his future manager/valet and real-life wife Miss Linda (Linda Gunthorpe Hawker). During the 1970s, Linda wrestled in Britain as Blackfoot Sue.  Later in America, the two formed a double-act, Miss Linda becoming one of professional wrestling's first female valets and frequently participating as an accomplice to Street's in-ring shenanigans.

Street and Linda made their North American debut in 1981. Appeared in various areas in the territories in North America, and finally settled in Ron Fuller's Continental Championship Wrestling (CCW) in Birmingham, Alabama in 1985. He worked early on as a heel against Austin Idol, Wendall Cooley and Norvell Austin before turning face in 1986. Street was so convincing as a heel that fans stood in shock as Street saved Bob Armstrong, under a mask as the Bullet, from an attack by Robert Fuller, Jimmy Golden and Tom Prichard. Street had a long feud there with "The Hustler," Rip Rogers. He returned to the area shortly before it closed in summer, 1989, teaming with Bill Dundee and Todd Morton against "RPM" Mike Davis and a young Masahiro Chono, as well as a feud against Terry Garvin (Terry Sims) and his partner, Marc Guleen, known as Beauty and the Beast.

After retiring from full-time in-ring work, Street ran the Skull Krushers Wrestling School in Gulf Breeze, Florida, until being forced to close doors following severe damage from Hurricane Ivan. Street and Linda also went into business designing and selling professional wrestling gear and other sundries via their website. He created the ring gear worn by Mick Foley as Dude Love during his feud with Stone Cold Steve Austin.

In 2005, Street appeared at WrestleReunion in a battle royal for the IWA Heavyweight Championship, which was won by Greg Valentine. That same year, he began wrestling for NWA Wrestle Birmingham, where he actively wrestled until the promotion ceased operations in 2014.

After his last match on 14 June 2014, in Birmingham Alabama, Street estimated that during his career he had wrestled between 12,000 and 15,000 matches.

Books
Adrian has released seven autobiographical books through CreateSpace.

 1. My Pink Gas Mask - 9 May 2012. 
 2. I Only Laugh When It Hurts - 3 June 2012. 
 3. So Many Ways To Hurt You - 12 June 2012. 
 4. Sadist in Sequins - 25 June 2012. 
 5. Imagine What I Could Do To You - 21 September 2013. 
 6. Violence is Golden - 1 January 2015.
 7. Merchant of Menace - 2 November 2015.

Other media
Street starred alongside Ron Perlman in the 1981 film Quest for Fire. He also appeared in Grunt: The Wrestling Movie (1985), as well as appearing in the opening scenes of Pasolini's 1972 film The Canterbury Tales as a wrestler.

Street and his band, The Pile Drivers, released the LP Shake, Wrestle and Roll in 1986. It compiled two earlier singles (from 1977 and 1980) with a selection of new songs.

A photo of Street in full regalia posing at the mine his father worked at features as the front cover of Black Box Recorder's debut album England Made Me.

A documentary titled Changing Perceptions: Profile of an Openly Gay Pro Wrestler produced in 2006 features an interview with Adrian Street in addition to the film's main subject, pro wrestler Simon Sermon. The film was produced by award-winning filmmaker Victor Rook.

Street is the subject of a documentary by visual artist Jeremy Deller, entitled The Life and Times of Adrian Street.

A biographical feature film drama on Street's inspirational life story is currently being made by film producer and director Joann Randles with the working title Adrian.

Jon Langford's Men of Gwent have written a tribute song called "Adrian Street".

Street's life story became an episode of the podcast Love and Radio in August 2018.

Personal life
In 2005, Street proposed to long-time manager Miss Linda at a reunion of the Cauliflower Alley Club. Don Leo Jonathan was his best man at the wedding.

Street has survived a bout with cancer.

In 2018, Street and wife Linda returned to Wales, citing the weather in Florida and the destruction of Street's wrestling academy by Hurricane Ivan.

Championships and accomplishments
All Star Wrestling
World Middleweight Championship (2 times)
Cauliflower Alley Club
Gulf Coast/GAC Honoree Award (2005)
Championship Wrestling from Florida
NWA Florida Heavyweight Championship (1 time)
NWA Hollywood Wrestling
NWA Americas Heavyweight Championship (1 time)
NWA Americas Tag Team Championship (2 times) – with Timothy Flowers
NWA Wrestle Birmingham
NWA Wrestle Birmingham Heavyweight Championship (1 time)
Pro Wrestling Illustrated
PWI ranked him No. 171 of the 500 best singles wrestlers in the PWI 500 in 1992
Pro Wrestling This Week
Wrestler of the Week (7–13 December 1986)
Mid-South Wrestling Association
Mid-South Television Championship (1 time)
Southeastern Championship Wrestling
NWA Southeastern Heavyweight Championship (Northern Division) (4 times)
Southwest Championship Wrestling
SCW Southwest Junior Heavyweight Championship (1 time)
Wrestling Observer Newsletter awards
Best Gimmick (1986)

References

External links
 

1940 births
LGBT characters in professional wrestling
Living people
People from Blaenau Gwent
Sportspeople from Blaenau Gwent
People from Gulf Breeze, Florida
Welsh emigrants to the United States
Welsh male film actors
Welsh male professional wrestlers
Stampede Wrestling alumni
21st-century Welsh LGBT people
20th-century professional wrestlers
21st-century professional wrestlers
NWA Florida Heavyweight Champions
NWA Americas Tag Team Champions
NWA Americas Heavyweight Champions